The Bentley 8 Litre was a large inline 6-cylinder super-luxury car made in various configurations by Bentley Motors Limited at Cricklewood, London. Announced 15 September 1930, it was also the last completely new model by Bentley before the company's financial collapse and forced sale to Rolls-Royce Limited. 

A Bentley 4 Litre featuring a 4-Litre Inline-6 engine in a shortened chassis was announced on 15 May 1931. 

Introduced a year into the Great Depression. the 8-litre and its smaller 4-litre sibling were unable to turn the company's finances around. Less than nine months after the 8-litre's introduction, Bentley Motors was placed into receivership.

Design and specifications

Engine
The straight-six engine used a one-piece iron block and non-detachable cylinder head with a crankcase made from Elektron, a magnesium alloy. It featured an overhead camshaft driven by a Bentley patented "three-throw drive" system of triple connecting rods with, like all earlier Bentleys, four valves per cylinder and twin-spark ignition (coil and magneto), which were state-of-the-art at the time. Pistons were of an aluminium alloy.

Both engine and gearbox were mounted each at three points on rubber to isolate the chassis and body from vibration.

Transmission
An entirely new design of four-speed gearbox provided four speeds (constant mesh third) and reverse with a single-plate dry clutch which sent power through a hypoid bevel final drive to the rear axle and its 21" Rudge-Whitworth wire centre-lock wheels.

Chassis
The 8 Litre was built on Bentley's largest rolling chassis, a ladder frame with large tubular steel cross-members downswept from the front and rear axles towards the centre to lower the centre of gravity.

Neither engine nor gearbox contributed to the bracing of the chassis.

Suspension by long semi-elliptic leaf springs was controlled by double acting dampers, friction on the front and hydraulic on the rear axle, and all four wheels were fitted with Dewandre vacuum-servo-assisted  drum brakes, the forward brakes being of Bentley-Perrott design.

Steering was by worm and sector and castor action could be adjusted to suit individual taste.

There was centralised chassis lubrication including the gaitered springs but not for the front axle or the clutch withdrawal system.

The 8-Litre chassis was available with either a  wheelbase or a longer  wheelbase. Three were built with a  wheelbase.

Reception

Announced on 15 September 1930 and launched at the London Olympia Motor Show in October 1930, the 8 Litre Bentley was noted for its tractability and smoothness; it could be driven from walking pace to highway speeds in top gear without effort.

As a result of the worldwide Great Depression, the 8 Litre did not sell well enough to improve Bentley's financial situation. The chassis was priced at £1,850, roughly equivalent to £293,000 in 2010.

Only 100 of these cars were made, of which 35 were on the shorter wheelbase and 65 were on the longer wheelbase. Fewer than 25 were fitted with open bodies. It is suggested that the cost of the development of the car was a prime reason for Bentley Motors going bankrupt.

Bentley made one more attempt at financial recovery by installing modified Ricardo 4-litre engines in a shortened 8-Litre chassis and selling the result as the Bentley 4 Litre. Announced on 15 May 1931, only 50 were made before Bentley Motors Ltd. was placed into receivership.

When Rolls-Royce bought Bentley Motors from the receiver in November 1931, it discontinued production of the 8-Litre and disposed of all spare parts for it.

Legacy

78 Bentley 8 Litre cars were known to survive as at mid-2011. Many of these have had their original limousine or saloon bodies replaced by new replica tourer bodies. As a result, Bentley 8 Litres with original bodies are much sought after by collectors.

The only Bentley 8 Litre with an American body, which was also the first Bentley with an all-metal body, was built by the W.M. Murphy Company of Pasadena for a customer in Santa Barbara, California.

McKenzie's Garages, a specialist in Rolls-Royce and Bentley cars, modified four 8 Litres in the 1930s: YM5050, with shortened chassis, lowered radiator and bulkhead, and triple SU carburettors, YR5083, with a higher-ratio rear axle and triple SU carburettors, YX5117, with a lowered and shortened chassis and triple SU carburettors, and YX5121, with a shortened and lowered chassis and a tuned engine.

Notes

References

8
1930s cars
Cars introduced in 1930